The World Group was the highest level of Davis Cup competition in 1994. The first-round losers went into the Davis Cup World Group Qualifying Round, and the winners progressed to the quarterfinals and were guaranteed a World Group spot for 1995.

Germany were the defending champions, but were eliminated in the semifinals.

Sweden won the title, defeating Russia in the final, 4–1. The final was held at the Olympic Stadium in Moscow, Russia, from 2 to 4 December. It was the Swedish team's 5th Davis Cup title overall.

Participating teams

Draw

First round

India vs. United States

Netherlands vs. Belgium

Sweden vs. Denmark

France vs. Hungary

Israel vs. Czech Republic

Russia vs. Australia

Spain vs. Italy

Austria vs. Germany

Quarterfinals

Netherlands vs. United States

France vs. Sweden

Russia vs. Czech Republic

Germany vs. Spain

Semifinals

Sweden vs. United States

Germany vs. Russia

Final

Russia vs. Sweden

References

External links
Davis Cup official website

World Group
Davis Cup World Group
Davis Cup